Frances Irwin Hunt (26 July 1890 – 25 August 1981) was a New Zealand artist. She was born in Cambridge, Waikato, New Zealand on 26 July 1890.

References

1890 births
1981 deaths
New Zealand artists
People from Cambridge, New Zealand